"Prelude 12/21" is the first song on AFI's seventh album Decemberunderground, written by Hunter Burgan, Adam Carson, David Paden Marchand, and Jade Puget, released in 2006. The song has a secret beginning if the CD is rewound twenty seconds before it starts. An altered version of the song was mixed with "Miss Murder" for inclusion in the director's cut of its music video. The number in the song title, '12/21', could be a reference to December 21, the winter solstice, which has the longest night of the year. In addition to being the first track on Decemberunderground and the fact that the title contains the word "prelude", it is often used as an opener at AFI shows. The song was also featured in the season 4 episode "Where Did You Sleep Last Night?" of One Tree Hill when Peyton Sawyer receives a boxing lesson from her half-brother Derek Sommers. It was also featured at the end of an episode of Smallville (specifically in the ninth episode of the sixth season, "Subterranean").

Professional wrestler Madison Eagles uses "Prelude 12/21" as her entrance theme in SHIMMER Women Athletes.

References

External links

AFI (band) songs
2006 songs
Music videos directed by Marc Webb